Hirtocossus cirrilator is a moth of the family Cossidae. It is found in Madagascar.

The wings of this moth are white with three large light-brown cellspots. The body and abdomen are white with brownish and blackish scales. The wingspan of the male is 73.5 mm.

See also
 List of moths of Madagascar

References

Cossinae
Moths described in 1919
Moths of Madagascar
Moths of Africa